Golongu (also Romanized as Golongū and Golangū; also known as Galangoor) is a village in Moghuyeh Rural District, in the Central District of Bandar Lengeh County, Hormozgan Province, Iran. At the 2006 census, its population was 60, in 10 families.

References 

Populated places in Bandar Lengeh County